Dmitry Dmitriyevich Meskhiev (born 31 October 1963) is a Russian film director. His 2004 film Our Own won the Golden George at the 26th Moscow International Film Festival, and his 2015 work Battalion won four out of nine nominations at the 2015 Golden Eagle Awards. He is the son of the Soviet cameraman Dmitry Meskhiev Sr.

Selected filmography

References

External links

 

1963 births
Living people
Mass media people from Saint Petersburg
Russian film directors